Own the Room is a 2021 National Geographic documentary film directed by Christina Costantini and Darren Foster, released on Disney+ on March 12, 2021. The film follows five students who compete in the Global Student Entrepreneur Awards for a grand prize of $100,000.

Premise 
Five students travel to Macau, to represent their countries and compete in the Global Student Entrepreneur Awards for a grand prize of $100,000. The film follows Santosh from Nepal, Alondra from Puerto Rico, Henry from Kenya, Jason from Greece, and Daniela from Venezuela. Each of the students detail their business ventures, including the challenges they have had to face to get where they are today.

Release 
The film premiered on Disney+ on March 12, 2021.

Reception

Critical reception 
Own the Room holds a 100% approval rating on review aggregator website Rotten Tomatoes, based on 8 reviews. Critic Jamie Davis describes the film as "the story of possibility, of daring to dream, of having the audacity to advocate for change even when people believe you can't or when life holds you back." According to Metacritic, which assigned it a weighted average score of 68 out of 100 based on 4 critics, the film received "generally favorable reviews".

Accolades

References

External links

National Geographic Society films
Disney+ original films
Documentary films about business
2021 documentary films
2021 films
2020s English-language films
2020s American films